United Nations Security Council Resolution 1692, adopted unanimously on June 30, 2006, after recalling resolutions on the situation in Burundi and the African Great Lakes region, particularly resolutions 1650 (2005) and 1669 (2006), the Council extended the mandate of the United Nations Operation in Burundi (ONUB) until December 31, 2006.

Resolution

Observations
The Security Council praised the Burundian people for the completion of the transitional period where authority had been transferred to democratically elected government and institutions. The resolution welcomed negotiations between the Palipehutu and Burundian government, facilitated by South Africa.  It recognised that, although there was an improvement in the security situation, there were still "factors of instability" present in Burundi and the Great Lakes region of Africa.

Acts
Acting under Chapter VII of the United Nations Charter, the Security Council extended the mandate of ONUB until the end of 2006. It also extended the temporary redeployment of military and civilian police personnel from the ONUB to the United Nations Mission in the Democratic Republic of the Congo (MONUC) until September 30, 2006.

Finally, Council members welcomed the intention of the Secretary-General Kofi Annan to establish the United Nations Integrated Office in Burundi, to succeed ONUB.

See also
 Burundi Civil War
 List of United Nations Security Council Resolutions 1601 to 1700 (2005–2006)

References

External links
 
Text of the Resolution at undocs.org

 1692
2006 in Burundi
 1692
June 2006 events